Lynda D. Wilson (born 1958) is an American politician currently serving in the Washington State Senate representing the 17th legislative district. A member of the Republican Party, she previously served one term Washington State House of Representatives having defeated Democrat and current state representative Monica Stonier in 2014. In 2016, she left the State House to run for a Washington State Senate seat being vacated by Republican Don Benton against Democrat Tim Probst. Wilson represents herself as a strong conservative and has a lifetime rating of 89% from the American Conservative Union (ACU) where outgoing State Senator Don Benton has an ACU rating of 79%.

Awards 
 2020 Guardians of Small Business. Presented by NFIB.

References

External links 
 Lynda Wilson at ballotpedia.org

1958 births
Living people
Republican Party members of the Washington House of Representatives
Women state legislators in Washington (state)
Politicians from Vancouver, Washington
21st-century American politicians
21st-century American women politicians
Republican Party Washington (state) state senators